Heat injury may refer to:
 Burns
 Hyperthermia 
 Heat illness
 Abiotic stress